Cares or CARES may refer to:

Cares, a river in Spain
Cares, a surname
Cares, plural of worry
Cardiac Arrest Registry to Enhance Survival (CARES), a cardiac arrest registry sponsored by the Center for Disease Control and Prevention and Emory University

See also
Care (disambiguation)